Bikalamakhi (Dargwa: БикIаламахьи) is a rural locality (a selo) in Kassagumakhinsky Selsoviet, Akushinsky District, Republic of Dagestan, Russia. The population was 54 as of 2010.

Geography 
Bikalamakhi is located 38 km south of Akusha (the district's administrative centre) by road, on the Khunikotta River. Kaddamakhi is the nearest rural locality.

References 

Rural localities in Akushinsky District